Juan Carlos Letelier Pizarro (born 20 May 1959 in Valparaíso) is a former football striker from Chile, who was nicknamed "Pato" and/or "Lete". He played for his native country at the 1982 FIFA World Cup in Spain. He played 57 times for his country scoring 18 goals between 1979 and 1989, scoring the last goal against Algeria at the 1982 World Cup.

During his club career, Letelier played professional football in Chile, Colombia, Brazil, Mexico, Peru, and Venezuela.

International career
At the international level, Letelier played for the Chilean team for an entire decade, making 57 appearances and scoring 18 goals between 1979 and 1989; his last international match came against Brazil on 3 September 1989.

Honours

Club
 Cobreloa
 Chilean League: 1982, 1986
 Universitario
 Peruvian League: 1992
 Sporting Cristal
 Peruvian League: 1994

References

External links
 

1959 births
Living people
Sportspeople from Valparaíso
Chilean footballers
Chilean people of French descent
Sport Club Internacional players
Independiente Medellín footballers
Santiago Wanderers footballers
Cobreloa footballers
C.D. Antofagasta footballers
Cruz Azul footballers
Club Universitario de Deportes footballers
Sporting Cristal footballers
Deportes La Serena footballers
Audax Italiano footballers
Caracas FC players
Chilean Primera División players
Liga MX players
Peruvian Primera División players
Categoría Primera A players
Association football forwards
Chile international footballers
1982 FIFA World Cup players
1983 Copa América players
Chilean expatriate sportspeople in Colombia
Chilean expatriate sportspeople in Brazil
Chilean expatriate sportspeople in Mexico
Chilean expatriate sportspeople in Peru
Chilean expatriate sportspeople in Venezuela
1987 Copa América players
1989 Copa América players
Chilean expatriate footballers
Expatriate footballers in Colombia
Expatriate footballers in Brazil
Expatriate footballers in Mexico
Expatriate footballers in Peru
Expatriate footballers in Venezuela